Depo Hostivař is a Prague Metro station and terminus of Line A. It is located on Černokostelecká street, which forms the border between Strašnice and Malešice in Prague 10. The station was constructed in the building of an existing metro depot and was opened on 27 May 2006 as the eastern terminus of the extension from Skalka.

References

Prague Metro stations
Railway stations opened in 2006
2006 establishments in the Czech Republic
Prague 10
Railway stations in the Czech Republic opened in the 21st century